György Kosztolánczy (born 24 May 1977) is a Hungarian judoka.

Achievements

References
 

1977 births
Living people
Hungarian male judoka
Universiade medalists in judo
Universiade gold medalists for Hungary
Medalists at the 2003 Summer Universiade